Maynard F. Jordan Observatory is an astronomical observatory owned and operated by University of Maine. Its first telescope was installed at the university in 1901, and was upgraded during the creation of the Emera Astronomy Center in 2014.  It is located in Orono, Maine, USA. It is the only public observatory in the state of Maine. Operated by the department of Physics and Astronomy, the eight-inch Alvan Clark telescope is housed under a roll-off roof, next to the more modern PlaneWave CDK20 in its own dome.

See also 
List of observatories

References

External links
Maynard F. Jordan Observatory Clear Sky Clock Forecasts of observing conditions.

Astronomical observatories in Maine
Public observatories
Buildings and structures at the University of Maine
1901 establishments in Maine
University and college buildings completed in 1901